Gyula Galovici (born 9 March 1956) is a Romanian modern pentathlete. He competed at the 1980 Summer Olympics.

References

1956 births
Living people
Romanian male modern pentathletes
Olympic modern pentathletes of Romania
Modern pentathletes at the 1980 Summer Olympics
Sportspeople from Oradea